Seven Oaks is an unincorporated community in Jackson County, Oregon, United States. I-5 has an interchange at Seven Oaks.

References

Unincorporated communities in Jackson County, Oregon
Unincorporated communities in Oregon